Krasna is a small village on the right bank of the Dravinja River in the Municipality of Poljčane in northeastern Slovenia. The area is part of the traditional region of Styria. It is now included with the rest of the municipality in the Drava Statistical Region.

References

External links
Krasna on Geopedia

Populated places in the Municipality of Poljčane